State Route 54 (SR 54) is a primary state highway in the U.S. state of Virginia.  Known for most of its length as Patrick Henry Road, the state highway runs  from U.S. Route 33 (US 33) in Montpelier east to US 301/SR 2 in Hanover Courthouse.  SR 54 is the main east–west highway of Hanover County, connecting the western part of the county and the county seat with the central town of Ashland, where the highway meets US 1 and Interstate 95 (I-95).

Route description

SR 54 begins at an intersection with US 33 (Mountain Road) just east of Montpelier.  The state highway heads east as two-lane Patrick Henry Road, which intersects Scotchtown Road.  Scotchtown Road heads north toward Scotchtown, the estate of Patrick Henry.  SR 54 heads southeast and crosses the South Anna River and Kings Pond, an impoundment of Falling Creek, before entering the town of Ashland, where the highway becomes Thompson Street.  The state highway intersects CSX's RF&P Subdivision just south of the Ashland Amtrak station.  SR 54 continues east as England Street, a three-lane road with center turn lane, and passes to the south of the campus of Randolph-Macon College.  The state highway expands to a six-lane divided highway at US 1 (Washington Highway) and passes through a commercial area between the U.S. Highway and the state highway's partial cloverleaf interchange with I-95.  East of the Interstate, SR 54 reduces to two lanes and leaves the town of Ashland, becoming Patrick Henry Road again.  The state highway intersects CSX's Piedmont Subdivision before reaching its eastern terminus at US 301/SR 2 (Hanover Courthouse Highway) within the Hanover County Courthouse Historic District.

Major intersections

References

External links

Virginia Highways Project: VA 54

054
State Route 054